The Zaton bridge is a bridge, that carries four lanes of traffic over the Belaya River, between Ufa center and Zaton neighbourhood of Ufa, in Bashkortostan.

History
This most in fact consist from two bridges which located near. One of them was built in 1971 and second was built in 2016 year. Second bridge was built in 2016 year for Ufa Eastern Toll Road project realizing.

References

Transport in Ufa
Bridges completed in 1971